James Robert Scott Sr. (June 22, 1930 – October 11, 2020) was an American Negro league pitcher from 1946 to 1950. 

A native of Macon, Georgia, Scott joined the New York Black Yankees as a 16-year-old in 1946, and played four seasons with the team through 1950. He was selected by the New York Mets in MLB's special 2008 Negro leagues draft, and was honored by the Atlanta Braves in a ceremony at Turner Field in 2016. Scott was inducted into the Macon Sports Hall of Fame in 2017, and died in Macon in 2020 at age 89.

References

External links
 Robert Scott at Negro Leagues Baseball Museum

1930 births
2020 deaths
New York Black Yankees players
Baseball pitchers
Baseball players from Georgia (U.S. state)
Sportspeople from Macon, Georgia
20th-century African-American sportspeople
21st-century African-American people